Sattleria dinarica is a moth in the family Gelechiidae. It was described by Peter Huemer in 2014. It is found in the Dinaric Alps of Montenegro.

References

Sattleria
Moths described in 2014